Thomas Chandler Thacher (July 20, 1858 – April 11, 1945) was a U.S. Representative from Massachusetts.

Biography
Born in Yarmouth Port, Massachusetts, Thacher attended the public schools.  He was graduated from Adams Academy, Quincy, Massachusetts, in 1878 and from Harvard University in 1882.  He became engaged in the wool business at Boston in 1882.  He served as president of the Barnstable County Agricultural Society.  He served as president of the Cape Cod Pilgrim Memorial Association.  He served as chairman of the Yarmouth Port Planning Board.  He served as chairman of the Provincetown Tercentenary Commission in 1920.

Thacher was elected as a Democrat to the 63rd Congress (March 4, 1913 – March 3, 1915).  He was an unsuccessful candidate for reelection in 1914.  After his service in Congress, he became a writer on business topics and also engaged in his former business pursuits.  He died in Boston, Massachusetts, April 11, 1945.  He was interred in Woodside Cemetery, Yarmouth Port, Massachusetts.

External links
Thomas Chandler Thacher at Flickr

References

1858 births
1945 deaths
Harvard University alumni
People from Yarmouth, Massachusetts
Democratic Party members of the United States House of Representatives from Massachusetts